Carnosic acid is a natural benzenediol abietane diterpene found in rosemary (Rosmarinus officinalis) and common sage (Salvia officinalis). Dried leaves of rosemary and sage contain 1.5 to 2.5% carnosic acid.

Carnosic acid and carnosol, a derivative of the acid, are used as antioxidant preservatives in food and nonfood products, where they're labelled as "extracts of rosemary" (E392).

References 

Phenol antioxidants
Diterpenes
Phenanthrenes
Isopropyl compounds
Carboxylic acids
Catechols